Christian Washington Núñez Medina (born 24 September 1982) is an Uruguayan footballer who plays as a right back for C.A. Cerro. His nickname is "Pichón".

Honours

Cerro
Liguilla Pre-Libertadores de América: Champion 2009

Nacional
 Torneo Apertura: Champion 2009 and 2011
 Torneo Clausura: Champion 2011
 Campeonato Uruguayo: Champion 2010-2011 and 2011-2012.
Copa Libertadores Runner Up (1): 2016

References

External links 
Profile on TenfielDigital.com 

1982 births
Living people
Uruguayan footballers
Uruguayan expatriate footballers
Association football defenders
Uruguayan Primera División players
Argentine Primera División players
Ecuadorian Serie A players
Club Nacional de Football players
C.A. Cerro players
Club Atlético Independiente footballers
C.S.D. Independiente del Valle footballers
Liverpool F.C. (Montevideo) players
Uruguayan expatriate sportspeople in Argentina
Uruguayan expatriate sportspeople in Ecuador
Expatriate footballers in Argentina
Expatriate footballers in Ecuador